The Saint Paul Lutheran Community of Faith, formerly known as St. Paul's English Evangelical Lutheran Church is a historic church at 1600 Grant Street in Denver, Colorado, United States.  It was built in a Gothic Revival style and was added to the National Register of Historic Places in 1997.

It is currently home to a Reconciling in Christ community, with a mission to be an "open, affirming, and diverse community of faith representing two Christian traditions, that of the Evangelical Lutheran Church in America.

From 2003 to 2019 the Lutheran community shared the Christian life and mission with a community of independent Catholics and was known as a "Lutheran and Roman Catholic" community of faith.  In 2018 our Lutheran Bishop challenged the Catholic members of the community about their lack of affiliation with an episcopal jurisdiction, which led them to an examination of the theology and praxis of the Ecumenical Catholic Communion (ECC) and subsequently to the decision to request acceptance as an ECC community in 2018. The new interjurisdictional collaboration, St. Paul Lutheran and Catholic Community of Faith, as a single community worshiping in two faith traditions served as an inspiration to both ELCA Bishop Jim Gonia and ECC Presiding Bishop Francis Krebs, who both saw us as a model of ecumenical unity “from the ground up.” Their dialogues, with input from the ELCA’s Chief Ecumenical Officer, led to the historic 2019 “Considerations for Collaboration in Mission and Sharing in Worship between Congregations of the Rocky Mountain Synod of the Evangelical Lutheran Church in America and Congregations of the Ecumenical Catholic Communion in this Territory.” Such collaborations eventually led the Catholic members of the community to grow more fully into their new ECC identity in relationship with the other 4 ECC communities of the Rocky Mountain Region, and since 2021 have been worshipping with Sixth Avenue UCC as St. Paul Catholic Community of Faith.

References

External links

Buildings and structures in Denver
Gothic Revival church buildings in Colorado
Lutheran churches in Colorado
National Register of Historic Places in Denver
Churches on the National Register of Historic Places in Colorado
LGBT Christian organizations